Quinn Ewers (born March 15, 2003) is an American football quarterback for the Texas Longhorns. Ewers attended Ohio State University in 2021 before transferring to Texas in 2022, where he became their starter.

Early life and high school career
Ewers was born on March 15, 2003, in San Antonio, Texas. He grew up in Southlake, Texas and attended Carroll Senior High School, where he played football and also previously played baseball. As a sophomore, he completed 291 of 402 passes for 3,998  yards with 45 touchdowns and three interceptions. Ewers and Southlake Carroll advanced to the Texas 6A Division I quarterfinals before being defeated by Duncanville. Ewers finished his junior season with 2,442 yards and 28 touchdown passes in eight games, missing six games due to injury, as Carroll advanced to the 6A Division I Texas State Championship Game before losing to Westlake High School. Following the season, he participated in the 2021 Elite 11 competition, but only managed sixth place in the competition.

Going into his senior year, Ewers was considered by multiple outlets to be the top overall recruit in the 2022 recruiting class. Ewers initially committed to the University of Texas in August 2020, where he would have been the first quarterback since fellow former campus recruit Vince Young to receive a perfect 1.000 247Sports composite rating. Ewers would later decommit from the Longhorns in October, before committing to play for the Ohio State Buckeyes in November 2020.

College career

Ohio State
Ewers officially enrolled at Ohio State in August 2021 and joined the team for preseason training camp. Ewers made his debut on November 20, 2021 against the Michigan State Spartans, taking two snaps at the end of the game in the Buckeyes' win over the Spartans.

Texas
On December 12, 2021, Ewers announced that he would be transferring to the University of Texas. He was named the Longhorns' starting quarterback entering the 2022 season.

Statistics

Personal life
Ewers is a Christian. In 2021, he became the first amateur athlete to land a Name, Image and Likeness (NIL) deal worth over 1 million.

References

External links
Texas Longhorns bio
Ohio State Buckeyes bio

Living people
2003 births
Players of American football from Texas
American football quarterbacks
Ohio State Buckeyes football players
Texas Longhorns football players